Ferroviário Esporte Clube, commonly known as Ferroviário, is a Brazilian football club based in São Luís, Maranhão state.

History 
The club was founded on September 10, 1941. Ferroviário won the Campeonato Maranhense in 1957, 1958, 1971, and in 1973.

Achievements 

 Campeonato Maranhense:
 Winners (4): 1957, 1958, 1971, 1973

Stadium 

Ferroviário Esporte Clube play their home games at Estádio Nhozinho Santos. The stadium has a maximum capacity of 16,500 people.

References 

Football clubs in Maranhão
Association football clubs established in 1941
1941 establishments in Brazil